Van Ferit Melen Airport  is an airport in Van, a city in the eastern region of Turkey. It is named after the Turkish politician and former prime minister Ferit Melen (1906–1988).

Airlines and destinations

Traffic Statistics

(*)Source: DHMI.gov.tr

Incidents and accidents 

 On 29 December 1994, Turkish Airlines Flight 278 crashed on approach to the airport, killing 57 of the 76 people on board.

References

External links

Van, Turkey
Airports in Turkey
Buildings and structures in Van Province
Transport in Van Province